Allium pskemense is a rare Asian species of wild onion native to Uzbekistan, Kyrgyzstan, and southern Kazakhstan.

Allium pskemense has been overharvested for its traditional uses in food and medicine, though there are some reports of it being cultivated in kitchen gardens.

References

External links
Ornamental Plants From Russia And Adjacent States Of The Former Soviet Union Allium pskemense

pskemense
Onions
Flora of temperate Asia
Plants described in 1905